Edmund Lilly D.D. (died 7 February 1610) was an English academic administrator at the University of Oxford.

Lilly became Master (head) of Balliol College, Oxford on 1 August 1580, a post he held until his death in 1610.
During his time as Master of Balliol, he was twice Vice-Chancellor of Oxford University for the periods 1585–1586 and 1593–1596.
Lilly was deemed an "excellent divine".

References

Year of birth missing
1610 deaths
Masters of Balliol College, Oxford
Vice-Chancellors of the University of Oxford
16th-century English people
17th-century English people